Aleksandr Mikhailovich Pobegalov (born 8 April 1956) is a Russian professional football coach.

External links
 Career summary by Footballfacts 

1956 births
Living people
Sportspeople from Yaroslavl
Russian football managers
FC Shinnik Yaroslavl managers
FC Ural Yekaterinburg managers
FC Luch Vladivostok managers
Russian Premier League managers
FC Volga Nizhny Novgorod managers